, nicknamed Chi,  is a Japanese professional basketball player who plays for the Aomori Wat's of the B.League in Japan. He had been the team captain of the Aomori Wat's.

College career
He's got Tohoku College Basketball League 3-point leader award in 2011.

Career statistics

Regular season  

|-
| align="left" | 2012-13
| align="left" | Sendai
| 18 || 0 || 2.3 || 27.3 || 0 || 75.0 || 0.3 || 0.1 || 0.2 || 0.1 ||  0.5
|-
| align="left" | 2013-14
| align="left" | Aomori
| 34 || 0 || 4.6 || 25.7 || 27.9 || 70.0 || 0.3|| 0.1|| 0.1|| 0 ||  1.7
|-
| align="left" | 2014-15
| align="left" | Aomori
| 25 || 0 || 4.7 || 26.4 || 16.7 || 71.4 || 0.4 || 0.2 || 0.1 || 0.0 ||  2.0
|-
| align="left" | 2015-16
| align="left" | Aomori
| 51 || 11 || 19.2 || 39.7 || 40.0 || 56.7 || 1.7 || 0.5 || 0.5 || 0.1 || 7.6
|-
| align="left" | 2016-17
| align="left" | Aomori
| 56 ||56  || 33.5 ||40.2  || 37.1 ||60.3  ||2.9  || 0.9 || 0.6 || 0.1 || 10.9
|-
| align="left" | 2017-18
| align="left" | Aomori
| 60 ||60  || 28.8 ||41.8  || 38.2 ||71.4  ||2.2  || 0.8 || 0.6 || 0 || 10.4
|-
| align="left" | 2018-19
| align="left" | Akita
| 49  || 6 || 13.4 ||30.0 ||30.1  ||46.7 ||1.1 || 0.6 ||0.4  || 0.0 || 4.2 
|-
| align="left" | 2019-20
| align="left" | Aomori
| 47  || 38 || 21.1 ||39.0 ||42.0  ||83.1 ||1.4 || 0.8 ||0.6  || 0.0 || 9.4 
|-
|}

Playoffs 

|-
|style="text-align:left;"|2015-16
|style="text-align:left;"|Aomori
| 2 ||   ||6.00  || .143   || .000 || .000 ||00 ||1.0 || 0.5|| 0 ||1.0
|-

Early cup games 

|-
|style="text-align:left;"|2017
|style="text-align:left;"|Aomori
| 2 || 2 ||26:09 || .556 || .200 || 1.000 || 2.0 || 2.0 || 1.5 || 0 ||11.5
|-
|style="text-align:left;"|2018
|style="text-align:left;"|Akita
|2 || 1 || 18:33 || .167 || .091 || .500 || 3.0 || 0.0 || 0.5 || 0 || 4.0
|-
|style="text-align:left;"|2019
|style="text-align:left;"|Aomori
|2 || 1 || 19:03 || .526 || .429 || .000 || 0.5 || 2.0 || 1.5 || 0 || 11.5
|-

Preseason games

|-
| align="left" |2018
| align="left" | Akita
| 2 || 1 || 15.1 || .333 ||.333  || .333||1.0 || 1.5|| 0.5 || 0.0 ||  6.0
|-

Source: Changwon1Changwon2

Gallery

References

External links
bj League three point contest 2016
Daichi Shimoyama #8,  Aomori Wat's: Full Game

1989 births
Living people
People from Goshogawara
Akita Northern Happinets players
Aomori Wat's players
Japanese men's basketball players
Sendai 89ers players
Sportspeople from Aomori Prefecture
Shooting guards